Jay Bergman may refer to:

 Jay Bergman (baseball) (born 1939), American college baseball coach
 Jay Bergman (businessman), American businessman and political donor
 Jay Bergman (historian), American professor of history